Stadion Miejski w Gdyni (Municipal Stadium in Gdynia) is a football stadium in Gdynia, Poland. It is the home ground of Arka, but has also hosted several international games, including those of the Polish youth national team. The stadium holds 15,139 people and replaced an obsolete ground by the same name that stood here since 1964. In 2017 Stadion Miejski was one of the host stadiums of UEFA European Under-21 Championship and will host several matches of the 2019 FIFA U-20 World Cup including the third place match.

Construction 

Designed by Warsaw-based firm SPAK, Gdynia was able to improve stadium standards, though the structure also earned some criticism as the roof only partially covers the seating area and was constructed using steel supports, thus creating obstructed view seating in some sections. Despite this, the Gdynia municipality preferred said design over a more efficient cantilever-style roof due to budget constraints.
Demolition of the previous stadium began on December 1, 2009, with challenging foundation work started over the duration of a harsh winter. By May 2010, the first completed stand reached its maximum height at 20 rows of terracing. The work carried out by Budimex-Dromex was due to end in late 2010, but were finished in the early weeks of 2011 after delays.

Inauguration
The opening ceremony of the stadium was held on 19 February 2011, with a historical exhibition match against Beroe Stara Zagora. The choice of opposition is due to Arka's historical links with Beroe as their first UEFA Cup Winners' Cup opponent in 1979. The game ended 1–1 with goals from Evgeni Yordanov and Emil Noll.

See also
List of football stadiums in Poland

References 

Gdynia
Sport in Gdynia
Buildings and structures in Gdynia
Sports venues in Pomeranian Voivodeship